Poroshkovo is a village in Uzhhorod Raion of Zakarpattia Oblast in Ukraine.

Until 18 July 2020, Poroshkovo was located in Perechyn Raion. The raion was abolished and its territory was merged into Uzhhorod Raion in July 2020 as part of the administrative reform of Ukraine, which reduced the number of raions of Zakarpattia Oblast to six.

Demographics
According to the 1989 census, the population of Poroshkovo was 3,410 people, of whom 1,676 were men and 1,734 women.

Native language as of the Ukrainian Census of 2001:
 Ukrainian 92.93%
 Romanian 5.65%
 Romani 0.68%
 Russian 0.34%
 Slovak 0.10%
 Moldovan (Romanian) 0.05%
 Hungarian 0.05%
 German 0.03%

Vlachs) in Romanian. According to Romanian media, Poroshkovo and other neighbouring villages are of Romanian-majority and Romanians form a 10,000–15,000-strong community in the region.

References

Villages in Uzhhorod Raion
Romanian communities in Ukraine